HNLMS Karel Doorman is a multi-function support ship for amphibious operations of the Royal Netherlands Navy, which is also used by the German Navy.
The ship replaced both of the navy's replenishment oilers: HNLMS Zuiderkruis (scrapped in February 2014) and HNLMS Amsterdam (sold to Peru in December 2014). At  she is the largest ship in service in the Netherlands navy.

She was built at the Damen yard in Galați, Romania, being the largest warship ever built in Romania. On 16 August 2013 the ship arrived in Vlissingen, the Netherlands, where final outfitting and installation of the weapon systems took place. In September, 2013, it was announced that as part of a series of Dutch defense budget cuts, the vessel wouldn't enter military service, but this decision was reversed by the Dutch government. The vessel cost 400 million Euros.

On 4 February 2016, German minister Ursula von der Leyen, and Dutch minister Jeanine Hennis-Plasschaert signed the LOI on the Dutch Navy ship HNLMS Karel Doorman. The German Navy will now, in coordination with their Dutch counterparts, be able to use the biggest ship in the Dutch Navy.

Characteristics

For maritime support the ship will have two Replenishment-At-Sea masts, the holding capacity of approx 8000 m3 of fuel, more than 1000 m3 of helicopter fuel, approx 450 m3 of potable water and approx 400 tonnes of ammunition and other supplies.

The JLSS has 2,000 lane metres for transport of material such as tracked & wheeled vehicles or containers. She has an elevator and crane for up to 40 tons, a roll on/roll off facility for vehicles, and a steel beach stern construction for accommodating cargo transfer via landing craft. The ship is equipped with two LCVP's landing craft.

For sea-basing operations she will have large helicopter deck with landing spots for operating two Chinooks simultaneously, and a hangar with a storage capacity of up to 6 medium-sized helicopters, including NH-90, AS-532 Cougar, CH-47F and AH-64D Apache.

The ship can accommodate up to 300 personnel, of which 159 are the ship's crew. She also has command rooms for war staffs and a large hospital facility with 20 treatment areas, and two surgery rooms. Modular flexibility allows configuration of temporary areas for evacuees or prisoners.

Positioned off shore, the ship is designed to act as a Sea Based Operations Platform supporting (amphibious) land forces with logistic support providing supplies and helicopter support (transport and attack).

Armament
The armament of the JLSS is heavier than that of the LPDs and replenishment ships, but is still primarily for self-defence. In high-risk operations the ship will require additional protection from frigates or destroyers.

Two Goalkeeper CIWS systems protect the ship against incoming missiles and aircraft at short range, while two Oto Melara Marlin WS 30mm rapid cannons provide force-protection against small surface targets such as high speed boats. The ship is also equipped with 4 Oto Melara Hitrole NT 12.7mm guns. The same weaponry has been chosen for the s. All weapon systems of the JLSS are remote-controlled from the operations and command room.

Sensor suite
Karel Doorman has the same sensor suite as the s. All sensor systems are housed in an integrated mast, provided by Thales Nederland, called the I-Mast 400, comprising a SeaMaster 400 SMILE air warning radar, a SeaWatcher 100 active phased-array surface detection and tracking radar and the GateKeeper infra-red/electro-optical (EO) warning system. With these systems the ship is able to monitor 140 nm using an Integrated Sensor and Communication Systems (ISCS), also by Thales Nederland.

Service history

Even though Karel Doorman had just finished sea trials and had not yet been commissioned, on 6 November she was sent on a three-month deployment to West Africa to deliver aid to Ebola-struck countries. She was loaded with different goods in 91 containers and 155 vehicles, including ambulances. On 18 November the ship arrived in Freetown, Sierra Leone for her first offload. After her third offload in Liberia and the replenishment of RFA Argus the ship returned to the Netherlands to pick up another load.

On 24 April 2015 JLSS Karel Doorman was formally commissioned and hence forward HNLMS Karel Doorman, pennant A833. Seen on 25 May on the St. Lawrence River, in front of Baie-St-Paul (QC), Canada, navigating upstream. She also stopped at Montreal's Old Port on 26 May 2015.
At 10am on June 17, 2015, she docked at Phillipsburg in St. Maarten. On 19 June 2015 at 12pm, she docked at Oranjestad in Aruba.

On February 3, 2016, Karel Doorman docked at Amsterdam in the Netherlands. In February it was decided that the Dutch navy would incidentally share the use of the Karel Doorman with the German Navy.

In the autumn of 2017 Karel Doorman was sent to the Caribbean for humanitarian aid after the region was struck by Hurricane Irma. Karel Doorman participated in the NATO exercise Trident Juncture in 2018.

Mid-Life Upgrade
The Karel Doorman is planned to undergoing progressive updates to extend its service life from 2025 onwards. Major changes that are expected include the replacement of the Goalkeeper CIWS with RIM-116 Rolling Airframe Missile and 76mm Sovraponte gun from Leonardo OTO.

Export
In January 2023 it was announced that the Irish Naval Service is evaluating the possible acquisition of a down sized version of the Karel Doorman for their Multi-role vessel program.

See also
 Joint Support Ship
 Royal Netherlands Navy
 German Navy

References

2012 ships
Ships built in Romania
Auxiliary ships of the Royal Netherlands Navy